Michael Goldberg  (December 24, 1924 – December 31, 2007) was an American  abstract expressionist painter and teacher known for his gestural action paintings, abstractions and still-life paintings. A retrospective show, "Abstraction Over Time: The Paintings of Michael Goldberg", was shown at MOCA Jacksonville in Florida from 9/21/13 to 1/5/14. His work was seen in September 2007 in a solo exhibition at Knoedler & Company in New York City, as well as several exhibitions at Manny Silverman Gallery in Los Angeles. Additionally, a survey of Goldberg's work is exhibited at the University Art Museum at California State University, Long Beach since September 2010.

Biography
A veteran of World War II, Goldberg was one of the last few remaining survivors of the New York School; he was sometimes referred to as a member of the so-called "second generation" of Abstract Expressionists, although he began exhibiting his action paintings in important group shows in galleries in New York City in the early 1950s. Goldberg began taking classes at the Art Students League of New York at age 14. In the 1950s he studied painting with Hans Hofmann, and he discussed painting with Willem de Kooning, Lee Krasner, Jackson Pollock, Franz Kline, Mark Rothko and several others of the New York School sometimes at The Eighth Street Club, a regular meeting place of modern artists working in and around Tenth Street in New York and sometimes at the Cedar Bar. He began to exhibit his paintings in New York City during the early 1950s, and some of his abstract expressionist peers included artists like Joan Mitchell, Alfred Leslie, Grace Hartigan, Helen Frankenthaler, Knox Martin, Friedel Dzubas, Norman Bluhm, and Sam Francis among others.

Goldberg came into prominence in the late 1950s, early 1960s just as Color field painting, Hard-edge painting and Pop Art emerged onto centerstage. With the changing of fashions in the art world; his greatest accomplishments as a painter weren't sufficiently recognized; and as many of his generation his work was overlooked for many years. He was known in early 1950's for an affair with the poet and playwright Violet Ranny Lang and is celebrated in her play "Fire Exit," as told in Alison Lurie's memoir V.R. Lang, Poems & Plays, with a Memoir by Alison Lurie. Although by the 1970s and 1980s his work began to achieve recognition and appreciation and he enjoyed a long, successful and a celebrated career as an abstract painter. His work like others of the abstract expressionist generation expressed a painterly integration of Western metaphysics and Eastern philosophy. Throughout his long career and into his mature years, he continued to teach, paint, and exhibit his work. His classes at the School of Visual Arts were well attended by devoted students, and admirers. He lived with his wife and longtime companion, the painter Lynn Umlauf, who also teaches at the School of Visual Arts. He died in Manhattan of a heart attack. He is also survived by his brother, the writer Gerald Jay Goldberg.

Collections 
Goldberg's work is in the collections of the Albright-Knox Art Gallery, the Baltimore Museum of Art, the Chrysler Museum of Art, the Walker Art Center, the Museum of Modern Art, the Solomon R. Guggenheim Museum,  the Hirshhorn Museum and Sculpture Garden, the Museum of Fine Arts, Houston, the Whitney Museum of American Art, the Muscarelle Museum of Art and many others.

References

Books and catalogs
Sandler, Irving H. The New York School: The Painters and Sculptors of the Fifties, New York: Harper & Row, 1978. 
Schimmel, Paul Action Precision: The New Direction In New York 1955-60, Newport Harbor Museum, 1984. 
Sandler, Irving H. Abstract Expressionism in the United States, Centro Cultural Arte Contemporaneo, A.C., Mexico, 1996
Marika Herskovic, American Abstract Expressionism of the 1950s An Illustrated Survey, (New York School Press, 2003.) . pp. 138–141
Marika Herskovic, New York School Abstract Expressionists Artists Choice by Artists, (New York School Press, 2000.) . p. 8; p. 16; p. 37; pp. 150–153
Anfam, David Perpetual Motion: Michael Goldberg, University Art Museum, College of the Arts, California State University, Long Beach, 2010.

External links
The Estate of Michael Goldberg
Biography retrieved online January 4, 2008
Biography retrieved online January 4, 2008
NY Times obituary, January 4, 2008
Michael Goldberg on artnet, retrieved online January 4, 2008

1924 births
2007 deaths
20th-century American painters
American male painters
21st-century American painters
Abstract expressionist artists
American abstract artists
Art Students League of New York alumni
Artists from the Bronx
People from Manhattan
American military personnel of World War II
20th-century American male artists